Lone Tree Wildlife Management Area is a wildlife management area in Seward Township, Nobles County, Minnesota. The nearest town is Fulda.

References

Wildlife management areas of the United States
Protected areas of Nobles County, Minnesota
Nobles County, Minnesota